Amynthas tokioensis, the Asian jumping worm, is a species of earthworm in the family Megascolecidae. It is native to Japan and the Korean Peninsula. It is an invasive species in North America.

These worms engage in parthenogenetic reproduction.

References

Megascolecidae